Robert Hugh Allen (1924 – 11 January 2013) was an Irish sailor. He competed in the Swallow event at the 1948 Summer Olympics.

References

External links
 

1924 births
2013 deaths
Irish male sailors (sport)
Olympic sailors of Ireland
Sailors at the 1948 Summer Olympics – Swallow
Sportspeople from Dublin (city)